Spowart is a surname. Notable people with the surname include:

 Doug Spowart (born 1953), Australian photographer
 Jamie Spowart (born 1998), New Zealand rugby union player
 Ruby Spowart (born 1928), Australian photographer
 Thomas Spowart (1903—1971), Scottish cricketer and educator